Prime Time is an album by Count Basie that won the Grammy Award for Best Jazz Performance by a Big Band in 1978.

Track listing
All music composed by Sammy Nestico, except where noted.
"Prime Time" – 7:33
"Bundle O'Funk" – 5:16
"Sweet Georgia Brown" (Ben Bernie, Kenneth Casey, Maceo Pinkard) – 3:34
"Featherweight" – 4:52
"Reachin' Out" – 6:36
"Ja-Da" (Bob Carlton) – 5:45
"The Great Debate" – 4:48
"Ya Gotta Try" – 4:00

Personnel
 Count Basie – piano
 Lin Biviano – trumpet
 Sonny Cohn – trumpet
 Pete Minger – trumpet
 Bobby Mitchell – trumpet
 Curtis Fuller – trombone
 Al Grey – trombone
 Bill Hughes – trombone
 Mel Wanzo – trombone
 Bobby Plater – alto saxophone
 Eric Dixon – tenor saxophone
 Jimmy Forrest – saxophone
 Danny Turner – saxophone
 Charles Fowlkes – baritone saxophone
 Freddie Green – guitar
 John Duke – double bass
 Reinie Press – bass guitar
 Nat Pierce – piano
 Butch Miles – drums
 Sammy Nestico – arranger, conductor

References

1977 albums
Count Basie Orchestra albums
Pablo Records albums
Albums produced by Norman Granz
Grammy Award for Best Large Jazz Ensemble Album